Thomas Gabor is a Canadian criminologist who was a professor of criminology at the University of Ottawa for thirty years; since his retirement, he has worked as a consultant on crime and related issues. He received his Ph.D. from Ohio State University in 1983. As of January 2017, he lived in Palm Beach County, Florida.

References

External links

Canadian criminologists
Living people
Academic staff of the University of Ottawa
Ohio State University alumni
Canadian consultants
Year of birth missing (living people)